Vicovaro is a comune (municipality) in the Metropolitan City of Rome in the Italian region Lazio, located about  northeast of Rome.

History
The area of Vicovaro was inhabited as early as the Neolithic period, as testified by remains dating from this period to the late Bronze Age. During the Roman domination, it was known as Vicus Varronis, Vicus Vari or Vicus Valerius.

In the 13th century, it was a fiefdom of the Orsini.

Main sights
Palazzo Cenci Bolognetti, a former residence of the Orsini. It includes parts of a rocca (castle) with cylindrical towers, remains of the keep and an entrance with a Gothic marble arch from the 14th century.
Church of San Giacomo, commissioned by Giovanni Antonio Orsini to Giovanni Dalmata (upper part) and others (lower part).
Church of San Pietro (17th century)
Monastery of San Cosimato (6th century)

References

External links

Cities and towns in Lazio